State Route 213 (SR 213) is an unsigned primary state highway in the U.S. state of Virginia. Known as Manassas Drive, the state highway runs  from the boundary between Manassas Park and Prince William County east to SR 28 in Manassas Park. SR 213 is the main east–west thoroughfare of the independent city of Manassas Park.

Route description

SR 213 begins at the boundary between the city of Manassas Park and Prince William County to the west. Manassas Drive continues west a short distance as SR 1501 to Lomond Drive. The state highway heads east as a two-lane undivided road that winds its way through several residential neighborhoods in the city. SR 213 reaches its eastern terminus at SR 28 (Centreville Road). Manassas Drive continues east as an unnumbered four-lane divided highway that serves the industrial side of town near the Manassas Park Virginia Railway Express station.

Major intersections

References

External links

Virginia Highways Project: VA 213

213
State Route 213